In mathematics, the Legendre transformation (or Legendre transform), named after Adrien-Marie Legendre, is an involutive transformation on real-valued convex functions of one real variable. In physical problems, it is used to convert functions of one quantity (such as velocity, pressure, or temperature) into functions of the conjugate quantity (momentum, volume, and entropy, respectively). In this way, it is commonly used in classical mechanics to derive the Hamiltonian formalism out of the Lagrangian formalism (or vice versa) and in thermodynamics to derive the thermodynamic potentials, as well as in the solution of differential equations of several variables. 

For sufficiently smooth functions on the real line, the Legendre transform  of a function  can be specified, up to an additive constant, by the condition that the functions' first derivatives are inverse functions of each other. This can be expressed in Euler's derivative notation as
 where  is an operator of differentiation,  represents an argument or input to the associated function,  is an inverse function such that ,

The generalization of the Legendre transformation to affine spaces and non-convex functions is known as the convex conjugate (also called the Legendre–Fenchel transformation), which can be used to construct a function's convex hull.

Definition

Let  be an interval, and  a convex function; then its Legendre transform is the function  defined by

where  denotes the supremum, and the domain  is

The transform is always well-defined when  is convex.

The generalization to convex functions  on a convex set  is straightforward:  has domain

and is defined by

If the convex function  is defined on the whole line and is everywhere differentiable, then

can be interpreted as the negative of the -intercept of the tangent line to the graph of  that has slope .

The Legendre transformation is an application of the duality relationship between points and lines. The functional relationship specified by  can be represented equally well as a set of  points, or as a set of tangent lines specified by their slope and intercept values.

Understanding the Legendre transform in terms of derivatives

Then, suppose that the first derivative  is invertible and let the inverse be . Hence we have  for each .

In practical terms, given , the parametric plot of  versus  amounts to the graph of  versus .

Properties
The Legendre transform of a convex function is convex.Let us show this for the case of a doubly differentiable  with a non zero (and hence positive, due to convexity) double derivative and with a bijective (invertible) derivative. For a fixed , let  maximize . Thus  where , meaning that  is defined so that . Note that  is also differentiable with the following derivative,Thus  is the composition of differentiable functions, hence differentiable. Applying the product rule and the chain rule yields giving so  is convex.

Examples

Example 1

Consider the exponential function  which has the domain .
From the definition, the Legendre transform is 

where  remains to be determined.

Thus, the Legendre transform is

and has domain  This illustrates that the domains of a function and its Legendre transform can be different. 

To find 

we compute

thereby confirming that  as expected.

Example 2

Thus,  and

Clearly, furthermore,

namely .

Example 3

For  fixed,  is continuous on  compact, hence it always takes a finite maximum on it; it follows that .

It follows that

Example 4
The function  is convex, for every  (strict convexity is not required for the Legendre transformation to be well defined).

Then, for all  one has

and hence .

Example 5: several variables
Let

Then  is convex, and

has gradient  and Hessian , which is negative; hence the stationary point  is a maximum.

We have , and

Behavior of differentials under Legendre transforms
The Legendre transform is linked to integration by parts, .

We thus consider the function  so that

This is widely used in thermodynamics, as illustrated below.

Applications

Analytical mechanics
A Legendre transform is used in classical mechanics to derive the Hamiltonian formulation from the Lagrangian formulation, and conversely. A typical Lagrangian has the form

In a more general setting,  are local coordinates on the tangent bundle  of a manifold . For each ,  is a convex function of the tangent space . The Legendre transform gives the Hamiltonian  as a function of the coordinates  of the cotangent bundle ; the inner product used to define the Legendre transform is inherited from the pertinent canonical symplectic structure. In this abstract setting, the Legendre transformation corresponds to the tautological one-form.

Thermodynamics
The strategy behind the use of Legendre transforms in thermodynamics is to shift from a function that depends on a variable to a new (conjugate) function that depends on a new variable, the conjugate of the original one. The new variable is the partial derivative of the original function with respect to the original variable. The new function is the difference between the original function and the product of the old and new variables. Typically, this transformation is useful because it shifts the dependence of, e.g., the energy from an extensive variable to its conjugate intensive variable, which can often be controlled more easily in a physical experiment.

For example, the internal energy is an explicit function of the extensive variables entropy, volume, and chemical composition

which has a total differential

Stipulating some common reference state, by using the (non-standard) Legendre transform of the internal energy, with respect to volume, the enthalpy may be defined by writing

which is now explicitly function of the pressure , since

The enthalpy is suitable for description of processes in which the pressure is controlled from the surroundings.

It is likewise possible to shift the dependence of the energy from the extensive variable of entropy, to the (often more convenient) intensive variable , resulting in the Helmholtz and Gibbs free energies. The Helmholtz free energy, and Gibbs energy, are obtained by performing Legendre transforms of the internal energy and enthalpy, respectively,

The Helmholtz free energy is often the most useful thermodynamic potential when temperature and volume are controlled from the surroundings, while the Gibbs energy is often the most useful when temperature and pressure are controlled from the surroundings.

An example – variable capacitor
As another example from physics, consider a parallel-plate capacitor, in which the plates can move relative to one another. Such a capacitor would allow transfer of the electric energy which is stored in the capacitor into external mechanical work, done by the force acting on the plates. One may think of the electric charge as analogous to the "charge" of a gas in a cylinder, with the resulting mechanical force exerted on a piston.

To find the force, compute the potential energy, and then apply the definition of force as the gradient of the potential energy function.

The energy stored in a capacitor of capacitance  and charge  is

where the dependence on the area of the plates, the dielectric constant of the material between the plates, and the separation  are abstracted away as the capacitance . (For a parallel plate capacitor, this is proportional to the area of the plates and inversely proportional to the separation.)

The force  between the plates due to the electric field is then

If the capacitor is not connected to any circuit, then the charges on the plates remain constant as they move, and the force is the negative gradient of the electrostatic energy

However, suppose, instead, that the voltage between the plates  is maintained constant by connection to a battery, which is a reservoir for charge at constant potential difference; now the charge is variable instead of the voltage, its Legendre conjugate. To find the force, first compute the non-standard Legendre transform,

The force now becomes the negative gradient of this Legendre transform, still pointing in the same direction,

The two conjugate energies happen to stand opposite to each other, only because of the linearity of the capacitance—except now  is no longer a constant. They reflect the two different pathways of storing energy into the capacitor, resulting in, for instance, the same "pull" between a capacitor's plates.

Probability theory
In large deviations theory, the rate function is defined as the Legendre transformation of the logarithm of the moment generating function of a random variable. An important application of the rate function is in the calculation of tail probabilities of sums of i.i.d. random variables.

Microeconomics
Legendre transformation arises naturally in microeconomics in the process of finding the supply  of some product given a fixed price  on the market knowing the cost function , i.e. the cost for the producer to make/mine/etc.  units of the given product.

A simple theory explains the shape of the supply curve based solely on the cost function. For a company selling this good, the best strategy is to adjust the production  so that its profit is maximized. We can maximize the profit

 represents the optimal quantity  of goods that the producer is willing to supply, which is indeed the supply itself:

If we consider the maximal profit as a function of price, we see that it is the Legendre transform of the cost function .

Geometric interpretation
For a strictly convex function, the Legendre transformation can be interpreted as a mapping between the graph of the function and the family of tangents of the graph. (For a function of one variable, the tangents are well-defined at all but at most countably many points, since a convex function is differentiable at all but at most countably many points.)

The equation of a line with slope  and -intercept  is given by  For this line to be tangent to the graph of a function  at the point  requires

and

Being the derivative of a strictly convex function, the function  is strictly monotone and thus injective.

where  denotes the Legendre transform of 

The family of tangent lines of the graph of  parameterized by the slope  is therefore given by

or, written implicitly, by the solutions of the equation

The graph of the original function can be reconstructed from this family of lines as the envelope of this family by demanding

Eliminating  from these two equations gives

Legendre transformation in more than one dimension

where

The multidimensional transform can be interpreted as an encoding of the convex hull of the function's epigraph in terms of its supporting hyperplanes.

If both maps happen to be inverses of each other, we say we have a Legendre transform. The notion of the tautological one-form is commonly used in this setting.

When the function is not differentiable, the Legendre transform can still be extended, and is known as the Legendre-Fenchel transformation. In this more general setting, a few properties are lost: for example, the Legendre transform is no longer its own inverse (unless there are extra assumptions, like convexity).

Legendre transformation on manifolds

Let  be a smooth function.

In other words,  is the covector that sends  to the directional derivative .

In terms of these charts, we have , where  for all .

Suppose that  is a diffeomorphism and let  be the “Hamiltonian” function defined by  where . Then we have

Further properties

Scaling properties
The Legendre transformation has the following scaling properties: For ,

It follows that if a function is homogeneous of degree  then its image under the Legendre transformation is a homogeneous function of degree , where . Thus, the only monomial whose degree is invariant under Legendre transform is the quadratic.

Behavior under translation

Behavior under inversion

Behavior under linear transformations
Let  be a linear transformation.

where  is the adjoint operator of  defined by

A closed convex function  is symmetric with respect to a given set  of orthogonal linear transformations,

Infimal convolution

Then

Fenchel's inequality

See also
 Dual curve
 Projective duality
 Young's inequality for products
 Convex conjugate
 Moreau's theorem
 Integration by parts
 Fenchel's duality theorem

References

 
 
 Fenchel, W. (1949). "On conjugate convex functions", Can. J. Math 1: 73-77.

Further reading

External links

Legendre transform with figures at maze5.net
Legendre and Legendre-Fenchel transforms in a step-by-step explanation at onmyphd.com

Transforms
Duality theories
Concepts in physics
Convex analysis
Mathematical physics